Glenn E. Bultman is a former member of the Wisconsin State Assembly, United States.

Biography
Bultman was born on December 11, 1940, in Milwaukee, Wisconsin. He graduated from Messmer High School and Marquette University. From 1966 to 1969, he was a member of the United States Army.

Political career
Bultman was elected to the Assembly in 1970. He is a Democrat.

References

Politicians from Milwaukee
Military personnel from Milwaukee
United States Army soldiers
Marquette University alumni
1940 births
Living people
Democratic Party members of the Wisconsin State Assembly